Maval Lok Sabha constituency is one of the 48 Lok Sabha (lower house of the Indian Parliament) constituencies in Maharashtra state in western India. This constituency was created on 19 February 2008 as a part of the implementation of the presidential notification based on the recommendations of the Delimitation Commission of India constituted on 12 July 2002. It first held elections in 2009 and its first member of parliament (MP) was Gajanan Babar of Shiv Sena. As of the 2014 elections, its current MP is Shrirang Barne now of Balasahebanchi Shiv Sena.

Assembly segments
Presently, Maval Lok Sabha constituency comprises six Vidhan Sabha (legislative assembly) segments. These segments are:

Members of Parliament

Election results

General elections 2019

General election 2014

General election 2009

See also
 Khed Lok Sabha constituency
 Pune district
 Raigad district
 List of Constituencies of the Lok Sabha

References

External links
Maval lok sabha constituency election 2019 results details

Lok Sabha constituencies in Maharashtra
Lok Sabha constituencies in Maharashtra created in 2008
Politics of Pune district
Politics of Raigad district